LibreOffice Draw is a free and open source vector graphics editor. It is one of the applications included in the LibreOffice office suite, developed by The Document Foundation.

LibreOffice Draw can be used to create complicated figures using shape tools, straight and curved tools, polygon tools, among other features.

Like the other components of LibreOffice, Draw can be run on Linux, macOS and Microsoft Windows.
There are community builds for many other platforms. Ecosystem partner Collabora uses LibreOffice upstream code and provides apps for Android, iOS, iPadOS and ChromeOS. LibreOffice Online is an online office suite which includes the applications Writer, Calc, Impress and Draw and provides an upstream for projects such as commercial Collabora Online.

LibreOffice Draw natively uses Open Document Format for Office Applications (ODF) (.odg graphics extension) which is an international standard file format established by the Organization for the Advancement of Structured Information Standards (OASIS).

Features 

Draw can be used to make flowcharts, technical drawings, brochures, posters, customized photos, photo galleries and albums.

Draw includes a spellchecker, autocorrect, thesaurus, hyphenation mode and color replacing. It has a gallery of shapes and drawings. It also supports as macro execution with Java, extensions and has configurable XML filter settings.

Import and export function 
 Import, edit, export PDFs
 Import Microsoft Visio .vsd files
Import Microsoft Publisher .pub files.
 Import from OTT, STW, OTH, OTS, STC, OTP, STI, OTG, STD and VOR formats
 Export to BMP, EPS, GIF, JPEG, PNG, PSD, SVG, WMF, as well as create HTML, XHTML, PDF and SWF files

Reception

In a 2014 review, Elena Opris wrote in Softpedia, "The Good: LibreOffice's best features are applicable in all modules. Draw sports numerous options and configuration parameters for defining each part of the graphical plan as well as for the general elements in the interface (such as toolbars and keyboard shortcuts). The styles and formatting presets simplify the entire layout designing process. The document recovery feature usually comes to the rescue when experiencing system crashes." Opris noted, "The Bad: The program often takes a while to paste pictures as well as to load some features. It froze several times during our evaluation when inserting files with unsupported formats, which eventually led us to restarting Draw."

Writing in December 2017 for It's FOSS, Ankush Das, said, "LibreOffice Draw module is one of the best open source alternatives to Microsoft Visio. With the help of it, you can either choose to make a quick sketch of an idea or a complex professional floor plan for presentation. Flowcharts, organization charts, network diagrams, brochures, posters, and what not! All that without even requiring to spend a penny."

PAT Research described Draw in a 2018 review, "LibreOffice Draw is a powerful office and flowchart software that provides a clean interface and tools that enable users to unleash their creativity and enhance their productivity".

GoFree wrote, "it is simply amazing that a free vector graphics editor like this can deliver such professional results."

References

External links

Free vector graphics editors
LibreOffice
Diagramming software
Vector graphics editors for Linux